Eugène Serufuli Ngayabaseka (born 1962, Ruruma, Rutshuru, North Kivu, DRCongo ) is a Congolese politician, the ex 2nd Vice President of the Congolese Rally for Democracy-Goma and was the governor of Nord-Kivu province from July 31, 2000 until 2007, when was succeeded by the RCD-K-ML candidate, Paluku Kahongya Julien.

Serufuli is a Hutu member of the Banyarwanda ethnic minority, who had migrated to Congo from Rwanda over the previous two centuries. He was born in Ruruma, Rutshuru district, North Kivu province. He studied at the Kinshasa University and worked as an anaesthetist at the Goma General Hospital. He was head of the hospital trade union and was an activist in the MAGREVI organisation which campaigned for Banyarwanda rights.

Political career
In August 1998 he joined the political board of the RCD and in October 2000, in the middle of the Second Congo War, he was appointed Governor of North Kivu by the Congolese Rally for Democracy. The appointment of a Hutu Banyarwanda was designed to bring them into an alliance with the predominantly Tutsi Banyarwanda led RCD and their Tutsi Rwandan government backers against the anti-Tutsi Army for the Liberation of Rwanda and indigenous Congolese ethnic groups such as the Hunde, Nyanga and Tembo.

In 2003, Serufuli created a "Local Defense Force" militia which was estimated to have numbered around 20,000. Non-government organizations accused him of recruiting children and Rwandan soldiers who had demobbed following the departure of the Rwandan army from DR Congo. Which were later proven to be false accusations.

In 2014, he was appointed as the minister of rural development. In 2016, he was appointed as the minister of small and medium companies.

See also
 List of governors of North Kivu

References

External links
Interview with IRIN in 2004

1962 births
Living people
People from North Kivu
Rally for Congolese Democracy politicians
Governors of provinces of the Democratic Republic of the Congo
21st-century Democratic Republic of the Congo people